Parramatta Power Soccer Club was an Australian professional association football club based in Parramatta, Sydney. The club was formed in 1999 as they were admitted into the National Soccer League in the 1999–2000 season.

The list encompasses the honours won by Parramatta Power, records set by the club, their managers and their players. The player records section itemises the club's leading goalscorers and those who have made most appearances in the National Soccer League.

Honours and achievements
 National Soccer League Premiership
 Runners-up (1): 2003–04

 National Soccer League Championship
 Runners-up (1): 2004

Player records

Appearances
 Youngest first-team player: Michael Brown, 16 years, 254 days (against Northern Spirit, National Soccer League, 13 April 2001)
 Oldest first-team player: Michael Gibson, 37 years, 30 days (against South Melbourne, National Soccer League, 31 March 2000)

Most appearances
Competitive matches only, includes appearances as substitute. Numbers in brackets indicate goals scored.

Goalscorers
 Most goals in a season: Ante Milicic, 20 goals (in the 2003–04 season)
 Youngest goalscorer: Brett Holman, 17 years, 305 days (against Newcastle United, National Soccer League, 26 January 2002)
 Oldest goalscorer: Alex Tobin, 36 years (against Sydney Olympic, National Soccer League, 3 November 2001)

Top goalscorers
Competitive matches only. Numbers in brackets indicate appearances made.

Managerial records

 First full-time manager: Dave Mitchell managed Parramatta Power from July 1999 to 2002
 Longest-serving manager: Dave Mitchell –  (1 July 1999 to 16 February 2002)

Club records

Matches
 First match: Parramatta Power 1–1 Marconi Fairfield, National Soccer League, 1 October 1999
 Record win: 
 7–0 against Football Kingz, National Soccer League, 15 February 2002
 7–0 against Marconi Fairfield, National Soccer League, 26 January 2003
 Record defeat: 1–6 against Perth Glory, National Soccer League, 3 May 2003
 Record consecutive wins: 5
 from 1 December 2000 to 29 December 2000
 from 1 March 2003 to 30 March 2003
 Record consecutive defeats: 5, from 5 January 2001 to 9 February 2001
 Record consecutive matches without a defeat: 6, from 26 November 2000 to 29 December 2000
 Record consecutive matches without a win: 6, from 5 January 2001 to 18 February 2001

Goals
 Most NSL goals scored in a season: 58 in 24 matches, 2003–04
 Fewest NSL goals scored in a season: 34 in 24 matches, 2001–02
 Most NSL goals conceded in a season: 47 in 34 matches, 1999–2000
 Fewest NSL goals conceded in a season: 27 in 24 matches, 2002–03

Points
 Most points in a season: 51 in 24 matches, 2003–04
 Fewest points in a season: 34 in 24 matches, 2001–02

References

Parramatta Power